A list of films produced in Russia in 2002 (see 2002 in film).

2002

See also
 2002 in Russia

External links
 Russian films of 2002 at the Internet Movie Database

2002
Films
Russia